The 1927 Sewanee Tigers football team was an American football team that represented the Sewanee: The University of the South as a member of the Southern Conference during the 1927 college football season. Led by M. S. Bennett in his fifth season as head coach, the Tigers compiled an overall record of 2–6 with a mark of 1–4 in conference play.

Schedule

References

Sewanee
Sewanee Tigers football seasons
Sewanee Tigers football